The U.S. Olympic Festival was a junior multi-sport event held in the United States by the United States Olympic Committee in the years between the Olympic Games. It was started in 1978 as an American counterpart to the communist Spartakiad – a similar event held on a quadrennial basis by the former Soviet Union and its former satellite in East Germany. As the competitive position of U.S. athletes in the Olympics slipped relative to that of the Soviets and East Germans, it was felt the U.S. needed some kind of multi-sports event to simulate the Olympic experience. It was originally called the National Sports Festival and was the nation's largest junior sporting event, before ending in 1995.

Editions
 1978 US Olympic Festival – Colorado Springs
 1979 US Olympic Festival – Colorado Springs
 1980 – Olympic Year
 1981 US Olympic Festival – Syracuse, New York 
 1982 US Olympic Festival – Indianapolis
 1983 US Olympic Festival – Colorado Springs 
 1984 – Olympic Year
 1985 US Olympic Festival – Baton Rouge, Louisiana 
 1986 US Olympic Festival – Houston, Texas 
 1987 US Olympic Festival – Raleigh-Durham, North Carolina 
 1988 – Olympic Year
 1989 US Olympic Festival – Oklahoma City, Oklahoma
 1990 US Olympic Festival – Minneapolis, Minnesota
 1991 US Olympic Festival – Los Angeles, California 
 1992 – Olympic Year
 1993 US Olympic Festival – San Antonio, Texas
 1994 US Olympic Festival – St. Louis, Missouri
 1995 US Olympic Festival – Denver, Colorado

References

United States Olympic Committee
Recurring sporting events established in 1978
Recurring sporting events disestablished in 1995
United States
Olympic festival
Sports festivals in the United States
1978 establishments in the United States
1995 disestablishments in the United States